Gymnastics at the 2014 Asian Games was held at Namdong Gymnasium in Incheon, South Korea from September 21 to October 2, 2014.

Schedule

Medalists

Men's artistic

Women's artistic

Rhythmic

Trampoline

Medal table

Participating nations
A total of 187 athletes from 23 nations competed in gymnastics at the 2014 Asian Games:

References

External links
 Artistic website
 Rhythmic website
 Trampoline

 
2014
2014 Asian Games events
Asian Games
2014 Asian Games